HMS Usk was a Yarrow type River Class destroyer ordered by the Royal Navy under the 1901 – 1902 Naval Estimates.  Named after the River Usk in Wales flowing through Newport, she was the first ship to carry this name in the Royal Navy.

Construction
She was laid down on 30 July 1902, at the Yarrow shipyard at Poplar, and launched on 25 July 1903.  She was completed in March 1904.  Her original armament was to be the same as the Turleback torpedo boat destroyers that preceded her.  In 1906, the Admiralty decided to upgrade the armament by landing the five six-pounder naval guns and shipping three 12-pounder eight hundredweight (cwt) guns.  Two would be mounted abeam at the foc'sle break and the third gun would be mounted on the quarterdeck.

Pre-war
After commissioning, she was assigned to the East Coast Destroyer Flotilla of the 1st Fleet and based at Harwich.

On 27 April 1908, the Eastern Flotilla departed Harwich for live fire and night manoeuvres.  During these exercises the cruiser  rammed and sank the destroyer   then damaged .

In 1909-1910 she was assigned to China Station.

On 30 August 1912, the Admiralty directed all destroyer classes were to be designated by alpha characters starting with the letter A.  The ships of the River Class were assigned to the E Class.  After 30 September 1913, she was known as an E Class destroyer and had the letter E painted on the hull below the bridge area and on either the fore or aft funnel.

First World War
In July 1914, she was on China Station based at Hong Kong tendered to HMS Triumph.  She deployed with China Squadron to Tsingtao to blockade the German base.  After the Japanese declaration of war, she remained off Tsingtao until the fall of Tsingtao in November 1914.

With the fall of Tsingtao and the sinking of the SMS Emden, she was redeployed to the 5th Destroyer Flotilla in the Mediterranean Fleet in November 1914, accompanying HMS Triumph, to support the Dardanelles campaign.

On 25 April 1915, under the command of Lieutenant Commander W. G. C. Maxwell, she supported the landings at ANZAC Cove.

On 22 May 1915, she escorted HMS Canopus from Malta to Mudros.

10 February 1916, found her on the Smyrna Patrol, enforcing the blockade of the Turkish coast from Cape Kaba to latitude 38° 30′ E, 200 nautical miles including Smyrna.  At this time she was based at Port Iero on the Island of Mytelene.

On 17 and 18 February 1916, she was involved in operations at Khios.  She remained in the Mediterranean until the end of the war.

Disposition
In 1919 she returned to home waters, was paid off and laid up in reserve, awaiting disposal.  On 29 July 1920, she was sold to Thos. W. Ward of Sheffield for breaking at Morecambe, Lancashire.

She was awarded the Battle Honour Dardanelles 1915 - 1916 for her service.

Pennant numbers
It is not known if she was assigned a pennant number as no record has been found.

References

Bibliography
 
 
 
 
 
 
 

 

River-class destroyers
1903 ships